Friedrich Dietz von Weidenberg (27 October 1871 – 9 December 1941) was an Austrian architect and sports shooter. He competed in the team clay pigeon event at the 1924 Summer Olympics.

As an architect he built mostly in his home district of Floridsdorf. His most important works are from the time between 1900 and 1910, like the Weissel-Bad (a former public bath, the façade is now part of a housing complex) and a villa that now houses the district museum (listed as cultural heritage monuments).

References

External links
 

1871 births
1941 deaths
Austrian male sport shooters
Olympic shooters of Austria
Shooters at the 1924 Summer Olympics
Sportspeople from Vienna